Nácor Burgos Rojo (born April 9, 1977, in Ávila) is a professional road racing cyclist. In 2006, he rode for the Relax–GAM professional cycling team.

Major achievements 
 2006 – Relax–GAM
 3rd, Overall, Tour of Qinghai Lake (China, UCI Asia Tour)
 2003 – Colchón Relax Fuenlabrada
 15th, Overall, Vuelta Ciclista a la Rioja
 2nd, Stage 1

Vuelta a España record 
 2006: Did Not Finish (Stage 16 crash)
 2003: 89th overall
 2002: 35th overall
 2000: 78th overall

External links
Nacor Burgos Rojo, official site

Spanish male cyclists
1977 births
Living people
People from Ávila, Spain
Sportspeople from the Province of Ávila
Cyclists from Castile and León